Mall of Sofia is a shopping centre in the centre of Sofia, the capital of Bulgaria. It was opened on 9 June 2006 and is located at the intersection of Aleksandar Stamboliyski Boulevard and Opalchenska Street in the centre of the city. Part of the complex is Sofia Tower, an office building located just above Mall of Sofia.

The mall is four storeys tall and has a total of 70,000 m² of built-up area, of which 35,000 m² belong to the commercial and entertainment sector and 10,000 m² are offices, while the underground parking lot takes up 22,000 m² and has a capacity of 700 vehicles. The remainder of 8,000 m² is occupied by service and common areas.

The complex was constructed after a project by MooreSpeakman International and boasts 130 stores, a supermarket, pharmacies, a beauty salon, an Internet café and DVD and video rentals, among others. Mall of Sofia also offers a number of restaurants and cafés (such as McDonald's, KFC, Subway), as well as Cinema City, a 12-screen multiplex cinema also featuring the first 3-D IMAX theatre in Southeastern Europe, M-Tel IMAX.

Among the investors in the project are GE Commercial Finance Real Estate, Cinema City International, Aviv Construction and Public Works and Quinlan Private. Colliers International acted as the exclusive leasing agent of the project.

See also 
 List of malls in Sofia

External links 
 Mall of Sofia website (in Bulgarian and English)
 Nikola Gruev's photo gallery of Mall of Sofia

Shopping malls in Sofia
Buildings and structures completed in 2006
Shopping malls established in 2006